The 2023 season is Clube de Regatas do Flamengo's 128th year of existence, their 112th football season, and their 53rd in the Campeonato Brasileiro Série A, having never been relegated from the top division. In addition to the 2023 Campeonato Brasileiro Série A, Flamengo will also compete in the Supercopa do Brasil, Recopa Sudamericana, CONMEBOL Copa Libertadores, the Copa do Brasil, and the Campeonato Carioca, the top tier of Rio de Janeiro's state football. Due to the 2022 FIFA World Cup being played in the December 2022 the 2022 FIFA Club World Cup moved its schedule to February 2023 into the Brazilian season, as the current Copa Libertadores champions Flamengo will play the competition for the second time.

Kits
The 2023 home kit has been unveiled on 26 January in a event in the club's headquarter. The shirt has returned to being mostly red and has debuted in Supercopa do Brasil against Palmeiras.

Supplier: Adidas 
Sponsors: Banco BRB (Main sponsor) / Mercado Livre (Back of the shirt) / Assist Card (Lower back)  / Pixbet (Shoulder) / Sil (Sleeves) / TIM (Numbers) / ABC da Construção (Shorts)

Season summary

Pre-season

On 14 November 2022 Filipe Luís extended his contract for another year until 31 December 2023.

On 25 November 2022 head coach Dorival Júnior announced he and Flamengo mutually decided to not extend his contract for another season.

On 13 December 2022 Flamengo and Vítor Pereira agreed to sign the Portuguese as the new head coach. Despite the agreement both sides decided to not turn official until his contract runs out with Corinthians to avoid any legal problem.

On 14 December 2022 Vitor Gabriel extended his contract for another six months until 30 June 2024 and then loaned to Ceará for the 2023 season.

On 16 December 2022 David Luiz extended his contract for another year until 31 December 2023. On the same day Flamengo announced the permanent transfer of Ayrton Lucas with a €7m transfer fee, he signed a contract with the club until 31 December 2027.

On 31 December 2022 Flamengo announced an agreement with Olympique de Marseille to transfer back Gerson in a €15m transfer fee.

January

After the opening of the transfer window Flamengo presented Vítor Pereira as the new head coach on 3 January and Gerson on 5 January. Rodinei left the club at the end of contract moving to Super League Greece club Olympiacos and Matheus Thuler, previously on loan, made a permanent deal with J1 League club Vissel Kobe in a €910k transfer fee.

On 9 January Flamengo confirmed Agustín Rossi signed a pre contract, moving on a free transfer from Boca Juniors at the end of his contract on 1 July. Flamengo still intended to pay a financial compensation to have the Argentine Goalkeeper already in January. Although Boca Juniors refused to hear any offer and moved him on loan to Al Nassr until June.

On 12 January, Hugo Souza transferred to Vissel Kobe on a €1.2m transfer fee, with Flamengo retaining 50% of a future transfer. Although, two days later Hugo withdrew the transfer claiming personal problems. Also on 12 January the club announced that Guillermo Varela, previously on loan, signed a pre contract for a permanent deal starting at the end of his constract with Dynamo Moscow on 1 July.

Due to calendar conflicts with FIFA Club World Cup the Campeonato Carioca started earlier for Flamengo with the matchday 5 match against Audax Rio being moved to 12 January. For the fourth season in a row Flamengo decided to play the first Campeonato Carioca matches with youth team players and younger professionals, this time with Mário Jorge (current U20 coach) as the head coach. In the opening match against Audax Rio Flamengo won 1–0, Matheus França scored the only goal of the match.

The draw of the 2022 FIFA Club World Cup was held on 13 January 2023 in Salé, Morocco, and decided the matchups of the second round and the opponents of the two second round winners in the semi-finals. Flamengo has been schedule to play on 7 February against the winner of the match between Wydad Casablanca and Al Hilal.

Vítor Pereira debuted as Flamengo head coach in the second match of the season, a 4–1 win against Portuguesa on 15 January.

On 19 January was announced Ramon's transfer to Olympiacos, the Greek side agreed to pay a €1.5m transfer fee and Flamengo kept 30% of a future transfer.

Against Bangu on 24 January, once again Flamengo was managed by Mario Jorge and played with members of youth team plus Rodrigo Caio, still recovering from injury. Lorran scored Flamengo's only goal becoming the youngest goal scorer in club's history with 16 years and 204 days.

On 25 January Pedro extended his contract until 31 December 2027.

After a battle between Olympique Lyonnais and Wolverhampton Wanderers to sign João Gomes, the midfielder finally transferred to the English side on 26 January. The Premier League club agreed to pay a €18.7m fee plus future clauses.

On 27 January Léo Pereira extended his contract until 31 December 2027.

In a thrilling match with seven goals scored on 28 January Flamengo lost the Supercopa do Brasil to Palmeiras 4–3.

February
On February 7, Flamengo debuted in the semi-finals of the FIFA Club World Cup against Saudi club Al Hilal and surprisingly lost 3–2 after playing the entire second half with one player less. Four days later on 11 February, Flamengo played the third place match against Egypt club Al Ahly winning 4–2 with Pedro and Gabriel Barbosa each scoring a brace. On this match Giorgian de Arrascaeta reached the mark of 200 offcial matches for the club.

On 15 February, Flamengo won Volta Redonda 3–1 and despite missing a penalty kick Gabriel Barbosa once again scored two goals reaching the club's top 10 all time top scorers.

On 21 February, Flamengo played the first leg of the 2023 Recopa Sudamericana against Independiente del Valle. The match was played in the Estadio Banco Guayaquil in Quito. The Ecuadorian club won 1–0, goal scored in a header by Mateo Carabajal.

On 23 February, Matheus França extended his contract with Flamengo until 31 December 2028.

On 28 February, the second leg of the Recopa Sudamericana was played at the Maracanã Stadium with a season record attendance of 71,411. Flamengo won 1–0, Giorgian de Arrascaeta scored the winning goal on the last play of the match on the 96th minute. The score forced extra time which remained scoreless. Ironically Giorgian de Arrascaeta missed the only penalty kick in the shootout as Independiente del Valle lifted the trophy for the first time.

March
On 5 March, Flamengo lost the first Clássico dos Milhões of the season 1–0 against Vasco da Gama, the only goal was scored by José Luis Rodríguez. Three days later on 8 March, Flamengo lost it's second city derby on a row, this time the Fla–Flu. Despite scoring first with Everton Flamengo let Fluminense come from behind with Germán Cano and Gabriel Pirani winning 2–1. With this result Flamengo, already qualified to the Campeonato Carioca semi-finals, dropped two spots finishing third in the overall table.

After finishing in third place in the Taça Guanabara Flamengo would face Vasco da Gama again in the semi-finals. On 13 March the clubs played the first leg in a match full of defensive mistakes Vasco da Gama opened the score early, but Flamengo managed to come from behind winning 3–2, including a beautiful Giorgian de Arrascaeta's goal from a long range.

Competitions

Overview

Supercopa do Brasil

Flamengo qualified for the 2023 Supercopa do Brasil by winning the 2022 Copa do Brasil.

Goals, assists and red cards are shown.

FIFA Club World Cup

Flamengo qualified to the 2022 FIFA Club World Cup as the 2022 Copa Libertadores champions, the club entered the FIFA Club World Cup in the Semi-final.

Semi-final

Goals, assists and red cards are shown.

Third place

Goals, assists and red cards are shown.

Recopa Sudamericana

Flamengo qualified for the 2023 Recopa Sudamericana by winning the 2022 Copa Libertadores.

Goals, assists and red cards are shown.

Campeonato Carioca

Taça Guanabara table

Matches

Goals, assists and red cards are shown.

Semi-finals

Finals

Copa Libertadores

The draw for the group stage will be held on 27 March 2023 on the CONMEBOL headquarters in Luque, Paraguay.

Group stage

Goals, assists and red cards are shown.

Campeonato Brasileiro

League table

Results by round

Matches
Goals, assists and red cards are shown.

Copa do Brasil

As Flamengo will participate in the 2023 Copa Libertadores, the club entered the Copa do Brasil in the third round.

Third round

Goals, assists and red cards are shown.

Management team

Roster
List of currently full members of the professional team, youth players are also often used.

  - Currently injured

New contracts

Transfers and loans

Transfers in

Loan in

Transfers out

Loan out

Statistics

Appearances

Players in italics have left the club before the end of the season.

Goalscorers

Penalty kicks
Includes only penalty kicks taken during matches.

Assists

Clean sheets

Penalty kick saves
Includes only penalty kicks saves during matches.

Season records

Individual
 Most matches played in the season in all competitions: 16 – Everton
 Most League matches played in the season:
 Most matches played as starter in the season in all competitions: 13 – Gabriel Barbosa, Giorgian de Arrascaeta
 Most League matches played as starter in the season: 
 Most matches played as substitute in the season in all competitions: 11 – Everton
 Most League matches played as substitute in the season:
 Most goals in the season in all competitions: 13 – Pedro
 Most League goals in the season: 
 Most clean sheets in the season in all competitions: 4 – Matheus Cunha
 Most League clean sheets in the season: 
 Most goals scored in a match: 2
 Gabriel Barbosa vs Nova Iguaçu, Campeonato Carioca, 21 January 2023
 Pedro vs Nova Iguaçu, Campeonato Carioca, 21 January 2023
 Pedro vs Al Hilal, FIFA Club World Cup, 7 February 2023
 Gabriel Barbosa vs Al Ahly, FIFA Club World Cup, 11 February 2023
 Pedro vs Al Ahly, FIFA Club World Cup, 11 February 2023
 Gabriel Barbosa vs Volta Redonda, Campeonato Carioca, 15 February 2023
 Pedro vs Vasco da Gama, Campeonato Carioca, 19 March 2023
 Goals in consecutive matches in all competitions: 5 – Pedro, 28 January 2023 to 15 February 2023
 Goals in consecutive League matches:
 Fastest goal: 24 seconds
 Matheus Gonçalves vs Botafogo, Campeonato Carioca, 25 February 2023
 Hat-tricks:
 Most assists in the season in all competitions: 4 – Matheuzinho
 Most League assists in the season: 
 Most assists in a match: 2
 Matheuzinho vs Nova Iguaçu, Campeonato Carioca, 21 January 2023
 Assists in consecutive matches in all competitions:
 Assists in consecutive League matches:

Team
 Biggest home win in all competitions:
 5–0 vs Nova Iguaçu, Campeonato Carioca, 21 January 2023
 Biggest League home win:

 Biggest away win in all competitions:
 3–1 vs Volta Redonda, Campeonato Carioca, 15 January 2023
 2–0 vs Resende, Campeonato Carioca, 18 January 2023
 3–1 vs Vasco da Gama, Campeonato Carioca, 19 March 2023
 Biggest League away win:

 Biggest home loss in all competitions:
 0–1 vs Vasco da Gama, Campeonato Carioca, 5 March 2023
 1–2 vs Fluminense, Campeonato Carioca, 8 March 2023
 Biggest League home loss:

 Biggest away loss in all competitions:

 Biggest League away loss:

 Highest scoring match in all competitions:
 3–4 vs Palmeiras, Supercopa do Brasil, 28 January 2023
 Highest scoring League match:

 Longest winning run in all competitions: 3 consecutive match(es)
 11 February 2023 to 18 February 2023
 Longest League winning run: 

 Longest unbeaten run in all competitions: 5 consecutive match(es)
 12 January 2023 to 24 January 2023
 Longest League unbeaten run: 

 Longest losing run in all competitions: 2 consecutive match(es)
 5 March 2023 to 8 March 2023
 Longest League losing run: 

 Longest without win run in all competitions: 2 consecutive match(es)
 5 March 2023 to 8 March 2023
 Longest without League win run:

 Longest scoring run in all competitions: 5 consecutive match(es)
 21 January 2023 to 18 February 2023
 Longest League scoring run: 

 Longest without scoring run in all competitions: 1 consecutive match(es)
 18 January 2023
 28 January 2023
 21 February 2023
 5 March 2023
 Longest League without scoring run: 

 Longest conceding goals run in all competitions: 4 consecutive match(es)
 5 March 2023 to 19 March 2023
 Longest League conceding goals run: 

 Longest without conceding goals run in all competitions: 2 consecutive match(es)
 18 January 2023 to 21 January 2023
 25 February 2023 to 28 February 2023
 Longest League without conceding goals run:

National Team statistics

Appearances and goals while playing for Flamengo.

Attendance
Includes all competition home matches in the 2023 season. Attendances recorded represent actual gate attendance, not paid attendance.

Notes

References

External links
 Clube de Regatas do Flamengo
 Flamengo official website (in Portuguese)

Brazilian football clubs 2023 season
CR Flamengo seasons